Paper Rex is a Singaporean esports organization based in Singapore. The organization was co-founded in January 2020 by Harley "dsn" Örwall and Nikhil "nikH" Hathiramani. The organisation is mainly known for their Valorant division, being announced as one of the pioneer franchises in Valorant's premier competition, VCT 2023.

History 
Paper Rex was founded in January 2020 by Harley "dsn" Örwall, an ex-professional Counter-Strike player and Nikhil "nikH" Hathiramani, the founder and chief editor of CSGO2ASIA. The team uses the Dreamcore Dream Centre, a  esports, entertainment hub, and retail store located in Singapore, to house their training centre and management staff.

Valorant

History 
Paper Rex moved into Valorant with their first roster on July 20, 2020, acquiring members of the Singaporean team Vindicta. The team would undergo multiple roster changes before letting go of every player, with the last two players being benched on February 5. 

On February 8, Paper Rex started their 2021 season by announcing the move of their Counter-Strike: Global Offensive roster into Valorant, a team consisting of Kumaresan "Tommy" Ramani, Aaron "mindfreak" Leonhart, Jason "f0rsakeN" Susanto, Benedict "Benkai" Tan, Jorell "Retla" Teo and Khalish "d4v41" Rusyaidee and Alex "alecks" Salle as their coach. 

On May 20, 2021, Paper Rex announced the departure of Tommy. On May 21, 2021, just a day later, Paper Rex announced the signing of Zhan Teng "shiba" Toh. Paper Rex would go on to place 2nd in the Southeast Asia Stage 3 Challengers Playoffs, qualifying for VCT Masters 3 Berlin and placing 13th – 15th.

On September 28, 2021, Paper Rex announced the signing of Wang "Jinggg" Jing Jie, moving shiba to a substitute position due to his compulsory military service.

They started the 2022 season by placing 1st in MY/SG Stage 1 Challengers and the APAC Stage 1 Challengers, qualifying for Masters Reykjavík as the top seeded team for the APAC region, where they placed 4th, their then-record high placing in an international event. Paper Rex would go on to repeat their domestic record in the next stage, placing 1st for MY/SG Stage 2 Challengers and APAC Stage 2 Challengers. This qualified them for Masters Copenhagen, where they placed 2nd and were the first Asian (and APAC) team to reach the Grand Finals, surpassing their previous achievement and recording their highest placing in an international event thus far. Paper Rex qualified to go to Valorant Champions 2022 but would fail to get out of group stage and placed 13th – 15th. On September 21, 2022, Riot Games announced that Paper Rex were selected to be one of the 30 franchise teams for VCT 2023. PRX won the Valorant India Invitational 2022.

Roster

Sponsors 
Paper Rex has 4 sponsors.

 YOU•C1000 which is their main sponsor and their beverage sponsor.
 HyperX (owned by HP) which is their peripheral sponsor.
 Dreamcore which is their performance sponsor.
 ZOWIE (owned by BenQ) which is their monitor sponsor.

References 

Esports teams established in 2020
Esports teams based in Singapore
Valorant teams
2020 establishments in Singapore
Defunct and inactive Counter-Strike teams